Sir Frederick Ulric Graham, 3rd Baronet DL JP (2 April 1820 – 8 March 1888) was a British landowner, diplomat and traveller.

Early life
The descendant of an old Cumbrian family, Frederick Ulric was born on 2 April 1820. He was the eldest son of Fanny Callander and Sir James Graham, 2nd Baronet, the British statesman who served as Home Secretary and First Lord of the Admiralty. He was a brother to Constance Helena Graham, Mabel Violet (wife of William Duncombe, 1st Earl of Feversham), Rev. Reginald Malise Graham, Helen Graham and James Stanley Graham.

His paternal grandparents were Sir James Graham, 1st Baronet and Lady Catherine Stewart (eldest daughter of John Stewart, 7th Earl of Galloway). His maternal grandparents were Col. Sir James Callander of Ardkinglas and Lady Elizabeth Helena McDonnell (a daughter of Alexander McDonnell, 5th Earl of Antrim).

Career

Sir Frederick was a Cornet in the 1st Life Guards and a Capt. in the Westmorland Yeomanry Cavalry. He later served as attaché to Vienna in 1842 while his father was Home Secretary. In 1847 he travelled on an expedition with the North American fur brigade across the Canadian west.

Upon his father's death on 25 October 1861, he succeeded as the 3rd Baronet Graham, of Netherby, Cumberland. He qualified as a magistrate for the county of Cumberland in 1861, served as Deputy Lieutenant and Justice of the Peace for Cumberland, and High Sheriff of Cumberland in 1866.

Personal life
Graham was married to Lady Jane Hermione Graham, daughter of Edward Seymour, 12th Duke of Somerset, and wife Jane Georgiana Sheridan. Together, they were the parents of:

 Margaret Frances Graham (1857–1927), who married Alexander Æneas Mackintosh, 27th Chief of Clan Mackintosh in 1875. After his death, she married James Grimston, 3rd Earl of Verulam in 1878.
 Violet Hermione Graham (1854–1940), who married Douglas Graham, 5th Duke of Montrose in 1876.
 Sibyl Marcia Graham (1857–1887), who married Robert Crewe-Milnes, 2nd Baron Houghton (later 1st Marquess of Crewe) in 1880.
 Sir Richard James Graham, 4th Baronet (1859–1932), who married his cousin, Olivia Baring, sister of Sir Godfrey Baring, 1st Baronet. After her death in 1887, he married his first cousin, Lady Mabel Cynthia Duncombe, a daughter of William Duncombe, 1st Earl of Feversham. After her death in 1926 he married his younger brother's widow, Florence Rose Wood.
 Hugh Graham (1860–1921), who married American heiress Jessie Low, a daughter of Andrew Low of Savannah, Georgia, and sister in law to Juliette Gordon Low, in 1888.
 James Reginald Graham (1864–1910), who married Florence Rose ( Wood), a daughter of J. Carter Wood and widow of Capt. Cyprian Knollys.
 Hilda Georgina Graham (d. 1946), who married George Faber, 1st Baron Wittenham.

Sir Frederick died at his London residence, 40 Park Lane, on 8 March 1888. Lady Jane died on 4 April 1909.

Descendants
Through his eldest daughter's first marriage, he was a grandfather of Eva Hermione Mackintosh (1876–1934), who married Sir Godfrey Baring, 1st Baronet (the brother of her uncle's first wife Olivia).

Through his son Hugh, he was posthumously a grandfather to Alastair Hugh Graham (1904–1982), an Oxford friend of Evelyn Waugh who was considered an inspiration for Sebastian Flyte in Brideshead Revisited.

References

1820 births
1888 deaths
Baronets in the Baronetage of Great Britain
English people of Scottish descent
High Sheriffs of Cumberland